Staffan I. Lindberg (born 1969), is a Swedish political scientist, Principal Investigator for Varieties of Democracy (V-Dem) Institute and Director of the V-Dem Institute at the University of Gothenburg.                                                                                                                                                                         
He is a professor in the Department of Political Science, and member of the Board of University of Gothenburg, Sweden member of the Young Academy of Sweden, Wallenberg Academy Fellow,  Research Fellow at the Quality of Government Institute; and senior advisor for the Oslo Analytica.

Lindberg's main research interests are comparative politics, democracy and democratization, Africa, political organizations, corruption and clientelism.

Early life and education
Prof. Lindberg has extensive project management and data administration experience outside of academia. In 1986, at the age of 17, he organised the largest musical festival in Sweden, Gärdesfesten. During 1988-1990 he was one of the international lead-coordinators for the youth project  Next Stop Soviet, involving the participation of 9,000 individuals from the Nordic countries and the Soviet Union in more than 350 projects. In 1987-1988 Lindberg worked as a production manager for a series of industrial films, ads, TV shows, including Sunes Jul and drama productions which included working with Donya Feuer at  Kulturhuset and Royal National Theatre. Lindberg received his Ph.D. in 2005 from Lund University, Sweden. His dissertation "The power of elections : democratic participation, competition and legitimacy in Africa"  won the American Political Science Association's Juan Linz Award for best dissertation 2005.

Career

Lindberg began his teaching career at Lund University, then worked as an assistant professor at Kent State University between 2005-2006. From 2006 until 2013 he was an assistant professor and then an associate professor in the Department of Political Science at University of Florida. He has also spent two years in Ghana as parliamentary advisor, and consults on a regular basis for donors in Africa.
In academia beside organising and chairing numerous international conferences, panels and other activities, Lindberg was the Program Chair for the African Studies Association in 2013. He also initiated and led the collaborative research project on democratization by elections between 2007-2009 involving  more than 15 renowned scholars from universities in the US and Europe. From 2006-2009 he was the co-PI of the international research consortium African Power and Politics program involving seven institutions across three continents with a budget of £3.5mn on behalf of the  University of Florida.
Lindberg was on the executive of APSA’s Comparative Politics Section (2011-2013), the Executive Co-Editor of APSA’s Comparative Democratization Newsletter (2012-2014), member of several scientific advisory boards, reviewer for a series of leading journals, and has won several awards. For 2.5 years at University of Gothenburg, he was project coordinator of the Center for Data Analysis, integrating the data and online analysis facilities of the SOM Institute, the QoG Institute, the MOD Institute, the Swedish NES, the Mediabarometer.  Lindberg was also in charge of the World Values Survey in Sweden at University of Gothenburg 2010-2012.

Books 

 Lindberg, Staffan I., 2009, ed. Democratization by Elections: A New Mode of Transition, Baltimore: Johns Hopkins University Press,  According to WorldCat, the book is held in 245 libraries 
 Lindberg, Staffan I., 2006, Democracy and Elections in Africa, Baltimore: Johns Hopkins University Press,   According to WorldCat, the book is held in 921 libraries 
Lindberg, Staffan I. Mapping Accountability: Core Concept and Subtypes. 2013. International Review of Administrative Sciences. 79(2): 202 - 226. Impact factor 0.783 (2011)
Weghorst, Keith and Staffan I. Lindberg. 2013. What Drives the Swing Voter in Africa?  American Journal of Political Science. 57(3): 717-734. Impact factor 2.756 (2011)
Lindberg, Staffan I. 2013. Have the Cake and Eat It: The Rational Voter in Africa. Party Politics 19(6): 945-961. Impact factor 0.954 (2011)
Coppedge, Michael, John Gerring, David Altman, Michael Bernhard, Steven Fish, Allen Hicken, Matthew Kroenig, Staffan I. Lindberg, Kelly McMann, Pamela Paxton, Holli A. Semetko, Svend-Erik Skaaning, Jeffrey Staton, and Jan Teorell. 2011. Conceptualizing and Measuring Democracy: A New Approach. Perspectives on Politics 9(2): 247-267. Impact factor 1.519 (2010)
Weghorst, Keith and Staffan I. Lindberg. 2011. Effective Opposition Strategies: Collective Goods or Clientelism? Democratization 18(5): 1193-1214. Impact factor 0.725 (2011) Reprinted in Green, E., J. Söderström, and E. Uddhammar (eds.) 2013. Political Opposition and Democracy in Sub-Saharan Africa. London: Routledge.
Lindberg, Staffan I. 2010. What Accountability Pressures Do MPs in Africa Face and How Do They Respond? Evidence from Ghana  Journal of Modern African Studies 48(1): 117-142. Impact factor 0.708 (2011)
Moehler, Devra and Staffan I. Lindberg. 2009. Narrowing the Legitimacy Gap: The Role of Turnovers in Africa’s Emerging Democracies Journal of Politics 71(4): 1448-1466. Impact factor 1.478 (2011)
Lindberg, Staffan I. and Minion K. C. Morrison. 2008. Are African Voters Really Ethnic or Clientelistic?: Survey Evidence from Ghana. Political Science Quarterly 123(1): 95-122. Impact factor 3.164 (2009)                                                                                                                                                                                 *Lindberg, Staffan I. and John F. Clark. 2008. Does Democratization Reduce the Risk of Military Interventions in Politics in Africa?  Democratization 15(1): 86-105. Impact factor 0.725 (2011)
Lindberg, Staffan I. 2007. Institutionalization of Party Systems? Stability and Fluidity Among Legislative Parties in Africa’s Democracies. Government and Opposition 42(2): 215-241. Impact factor 0.5 (2011)
Lindberg, Staffan I. 2006. Opposition Parties and Democratization in sub-Saharan Africa. Journal of Contemporary African Politics 24(1): 123-138. Impact factor 0.48 (2006)
Lindberg, Staffan I. and Minion K. C. Morrison. 2005. Exploring Voter Alignments in Africa: Core and Swing Voters in Ghana. Journal of Modern African Studies 43(4): 1-22. Impact factor 0.708 (2011)
Lindberg, Staffan I. 2005. Consequences of Electoral Systems in Africa: A Preliminary Inquiry. Electoral Studies 24(1): 41-64. Impact factor 1.470 (2011-five year average)
Lindberg, Staffan I. 2004. Democratization and Women’s Empowerment: The Effects of Electoral Systems, Participation and Repetition in Africa. Studies in Comparative International Development 39(1): 28-53. Impact factor 0.650 (2011)
Lindberg, Staffan I. 2004. The Democratic Qualities of Multiparty Elections: Participation, Competition and Legitimacy in Africa. Journal of Commonwealth and Comparative Politics 42(1): 61-105. Impact factor not available.
Lindberg, Staffan I. 2003. It’s Our Time to ‘Chop’: Do Elections in Africa Feed Neopatrimonialism rather than Counter-Act It? Democratization 14(2): 121-140. Impact factor 0.725 (2011)
Lindberg, Staffan I. 2001. Forms of State, Governance and Regime: Reconceptualising the Prospects for Democratic Consolidation in sub-Saharan Africa. International Political Science Review 22(2): 173-199. Impact factor 0.618 (2011)

Other academic journal articles 

Lindberg, Staffan I. 2013. Confusing Categories, Shifting Targets. Journal of Democracy 24(4): 161-167.
Lindberg, Staffan I. and Jan Teorell. 2013. Demokrati, Diktatur, eller Auktoritär? Ett nytt sätt att mäta demokrati. Statsvetenskaplig tidsskrift. 
Coppedge, Michael, John Gerring, and Staffan I. Lindberg. 2012. Variedades de Democracia: Un enfoque histórico, multidimensional y desagregado. Revista Española de Ciencia Política, nota de investigación n. 422, número 30 -noviembre.
Lindberg, Staffan I. 2009. Democratization by Elections: A Mixed Record. Journal of Democracy 20(3): 86-92. Impact factor 1.008 (2011)
Lindberg, Staffan I. 2006. The Surprising Significance of African Elections. Journal of Democracy 17(1): 139-151. Impact factor 1.008 (2011)
Lindberg, Staffan I. 2002. Demokratiska val i Afrika. Internationella Studier No. 4 (Winter). (“Democratic Elections in Africa” International Studies)

Chapters in peer-reviewed books 

Lindberg, Staffan I. 2012. Legislators and Variation in Quality of Government. Chapter 11 in Holmberg, Sören & Bo Rothstein (eds). Understanding Quality of Government. Edward Elgar Publisher, pp. 210–229.
Lindberg, Staffan I. and Sara Meerow. 2011. Persistent Authoritarianism and the Future of Democracy in Africa. Chapter 7 in Brown, Nathan (ed.) Democratization:  Doubt, Dictatorship, Diffusion, and Development. Baltimore: Johns Hopkins University Press., pp. 183–211.
Lindberg, Staffan I. and Jonathan Jones. 2010. Laying a Foundation for Democracy or Undermining It?, Chapter 11 in Bogaards, Matthijs and Françoise Boucek (eds.) Dominant Parties and Democracy. London: Routledge, pp. 196–218.
Lindberg, Staffan I. 2009. Cooptation Despite Democratization in Ghana. Chapter 5 in Barkan, Joel (ed.) Legislative Power in Emerging African Democracies. Boulder, C.O.: Lynne Rienner, pp. 147–176.
Lindberg, Staffan I.  2009. Introduction.  In Lindberg, Staffan I. (ed.) Democratization by Elections: A New Mode of Transition?. Baltimore: Johns Hopkins University Press. 
Lindberg, Staffan I. 2009. The Power of Elections Revisited. Chapter 1 in Lindberg, Staffan I. (ed.) Democratization by Elections: A New Mode of Transition?. Baltimore: Johns Hopkins University Press, pp. 25–46. 
Lindberg, Staffan I. 2009.  A Theory of Elections as a Mode of Transition. Chapter 13 in Lindberg, Staffan I. (ed.) Democratization by Elections: A New Mode of Transition?. Baltimore: Johns Hopkins University Press. 
Lindberg, Staffan I. 2006. Why Do Opposition Boycott Elections? Chapter 9 in Schedler, Andreas (ed.) Electoral Authoritarianism. Boulder C.O.: Lynne Rienner.
Lindberg, Staffan I. 2002. Problems of Measuring Democracy: Illustrations from Africa. Chapter 7 in Göran Hydén and Ole Elgström (eds.) Development and Democracy: What have we learnt and how?, London: Routledge.

References

External links
 http://www.pol.gu.se/personal/larare-och-forskare/lindberg--Staffan-i.
 https://v-dem.net/
 https://papers.ssrn.com/sol3/cf_dev/AbsByAuth.cfm?per_id=864348
 Google Scholar report

1969 births
Living people
Lund University alumni
Swedish political scientists
Swedish Africanists
Academic staff of the University of Gothenburg